Peter of Aragon (4 May 1152 - c.1164) was the oldest child of Queen Petronilla of Aragon and her husband, Ramon Berenguer IV, Count of Barcelona. He inherited, after his father's death, Cerdagne, Carcassonne and Narbonne.

Not much information about Peter survives, but it is known for sure that he existed. The Corónicas Navarras names all of Petronilla's children, in order, as don Pedro...el rey don Alfonso, que ovo nombre Remón Belenguer et el conte don Pedro de Provença et el conte don Sancho et a la muller del rey don Sancho de Portugal. Peter was named Count of Cerdanya, Carcassonne and Narbonne.

Some sources state that Peter died in 1157, sometime after King Alfonso VII of León and Castile died. This year of death is also likely since the third son, also named Peter, was born in 1158. It is certain that the elder son Peter was dead by 18 July 1164, as his mother abdicated in favour of his younger brother, Ramon, rather than Peter, who had been named heir of Aragon at birth. The Corónicas Navarras also stated that Peter died in Huesca.

Notes

References

1152 births
1157 deaths
Year of death unknown
Counts of Cerdanya
Counts of Carcassonne
Counts of Barcelona
House of Barcelona
Royalty and nobility who died as children
Sons of monarchs
Heirs apparent who never acceded